Ingonde, Ingund, Ingunda, or (in Latin) Ingundis (c. 499 in Thuringia – 546) was a queen of the Franks by marriage to Clotaire I, son of Clovis.

She was the daughter of King Baderic of Thuringia (c. 480 – c. 529). She became concubine to Clotaire in c.517, before his marriage in c. 524 to Guntheuc, widow of Clotaire's brother Chlodomer. This brought Clotaire access to Chlodomer's treasury. On Guntheuc's death in 532, Clotaire married Ingund. During their long relationship, she bore him six children, four of whom would become kings or queen:

 Gonthaire or Gonthier, in Latin Gunthacharius, born around 517, died after 532. He took part around 532 in a military campaign led in Septimania;
 Charibert I (or Caribert; circa 521-567), king of Paris from 561 to 567;
 Guntram (or Gontran; around 533-592), King of Burgundy from 561 to 592, King of Paris from 584 to 592;
 Sigebert I (circa 535-575), king of Austrasia from 561 to 575.

 Childeric (possibly Childebert or Childericus ), died before 561;
 Clodoswinthe, died before 567. She became Queen of the Lombards by marrying King Alboin, son of Aldoin .

Shortly after their marriage (c. 533–538) Ingund requested of Clotaire that he find a husband worthy of her sister, Aregund. Finding no one suitable, Chlothar took Aregund as one of his own wives in a polygamous marriage. Ingund did not object to this arrangement; Aregund remained his wife until Ingund's death in 546, after which she fell out of favor with Chlothar.

Primary references from Gregory of Tours

References 

Thuringian women
Frankish queens consort
Merovingian dynasty
499 births
Year of death unknown
6th-century Frankish nobility
6th-century Frankish women